HR 3750 is a binary star system in the equatorial constellation of Hydra at a distance of 101 light years. This object is visible to the naked eye as a dim, white star with an apparent visual magnitude of 5.4. It is receding from the Earth with a heliocentric radial velocity of 57.9 km/s. This binary is unusual because its eruptions do not seem to conform to the Waldmeier effect—i.e. the strongest eruptions of HR 3750 are not the ones characterized by the fast eruption onset. Kinematically, the binary belongs to the thick disk of the Milky Way galaxy - a population of ancient, metal-poor stars.

The star system is a spectroscopic binary with a 32 year, nearly edge-on orbit. The primary, HD 81809 A's visual magnitude is 5.610 while the secondary, HD 81809 B's visual magnitude is 7.115 The larger star, HD 81809 A, is unusually inflated for its age and composition, possibly due to engulfment of a 0.36 red dwarf star 1-3 billion years ago.

HD 81809 A has a well defined chromospheric activity cycle with a period of 7.3 years.

References

G-type main-sequence stars
G-type subgiants
Binary stars
Hydra (constellation)
BD-05 2802
0344
81809
046404
3750
J09274680-0604164